Yavne'el is a moshava and local council in the Northern District of Israel. Founded in 1901, it is one of the oldest rural Jewish communities in the country. In 2008 the population had been of 3,100, with a growth rate of 1.4%.

History

Archaeological overview
Remains from the Late Bronze Age, Iron Age I–II, Persian, Hellenistic, Roman, late Byzantine, early Muslim and Mamluk periods have been found here.

A residential building constructed in the Umayyad period that continued to be inhabited during the Abbasid period (eighth–tenth centuries CE) has been excavated here.

Remains from the Mamluk period have also been found.

Ottoman period

Arab village
During the Ottoman period the Muslim village in the area was known as ’’Yemma’’. The village was mentioned in the Ottoman defter for the year 1555-6, located in the Nahiya of Tabariyya of the Liwa of Safad, with its land designated as Timar land.

A map by Pierre Jacotin from Napoleon's invasion of 1799 noted the place. 
In 1875 Victor Guérin visited, and described the village as rather ruined and built of basaltic stone, situated in a fertile valley. In 1881, the PEF's Survey of Western Palestine (SWP) described Yemma as having basaltic stone houses, containing 100 Muslims, on an arable plain. There were no gardens or trees, but two springs were near, and the village had cisterns. To the south-west of this site there was a supply of water among the rocks of the valley.

Jewish settlement
The "Yamah" settlement was initially planned for 40 farms, each holding 300 dunams. What is now Yavne'el was established on October 7, 1901, by the Jewish Colonization Association on lands bought from the Delaike (Al-Dalaika) Bedouin tribe by Baron Rothschild. The name "Yavne'el" was taken from a biblical city (Joshua 19:33) in the allotment of the tribe of Naphtali, situated in this area. The first settlers came from the Hauran region (Jewish settlers of the Hauran or "Horan" as it was called, had been evicted from there in 1898 by the Ottoman authorities), joined in December 1901 by villagers from Metula. In 1914–15, immigrant families from Yemen settled in Yavne'el.

The new colony of Beit Gan was founded in 1904 as a moshav.

British Mandate

In the 1922 census of Palestine conducted by the British Mandate authorities, Yabnieh (Yamma) had a total population of 447; 82 Muslims and 365 Jews. At the time of the 1931 census, Yavneel still had exactly the same population of 447; but now it was 56 Muslims and 391 Jews, in a total of 102 houses.

Hitahdut HaMoshavot BeYehuda VeShomron ('Association of moshavot in Judea and Samaria'), the oldest settlement movement for private farmers in the Land of Israel, was founded in Yavne'el in 1920.

When three Jewish residents were murdered by Arab rioters on the road between Yavne'el and Beit Gan in 1937 during the country-wide Arab revolt, a new settlement named in their honour, the moshav Mishmar HaShlosha (lit. 'Guard of the Three'), was established nearby.

In the 1945 statistics, Yavneel was home to 590 people, all Jews.

In 1947 an improvised landing strip in the fields of the moshava was used for landing by a transport airplane bringing Jewish refugees, twice from Baghdad and once from Italy.

State of Israel

Located southwest of Tiberias, it was declared a local council in 1951.

Many organisations were established in Yavne'el, including the Israeli Farmers Union, the Galilee Squadron and the Golani Brigade.

Administration
The local council is jointly responsible for Yavne'el, Beit Gan, Mishmar HaShlosha, and Smadar. The first three were established as moshavot (early Zionist agricultural colonies) and are very close to each other, while Smadar, originally a moshav (communal village with more economic autonomy for the member families than a kibbutz), is slightly farther away.

Farmer community
In 1991, the authors of a book on Jewish identity in contemporary Israel noticed that, although in many ways typical for the processes Israeli society underwent since its inception, Yavne'el has a core group of farmers described as "rooted yeomanry", uncommon outside the few moshavot of the first hour of Zionist settlement that retained their initial rural character - no more than a dozen in the entire country. These farmers are deeply connected to the place, dedicated to working the land, and see themselves as spearheading the tremendously important task of returning the nation to a set of values long lost or ignored by Jews everywhere else, starting with different-minded neighbours from Yavne'el. They are compared to wheat farmers of the American Midwest or Sweden, in the way they both sound and look.

Breslov community
In 1986, Rabbi Eliezer Shlomo Schick founded a Breslov community largely consisting of baalei teshuvah (newly religious) adherents in Yavne'el. As of 2015 this community, which calls itself "Breslov City", numbers nearly 400 families, representing 30 percent of the town's population. The community has its own educational and civic organizations, including a Talmud Torah, girls' school, yeshiva ketana, yeshiva gedola, kollel, beis medrash (study/prayer hall), and charity and humanitarian organizations.

Notable residents
Ruth Amiran (1914–2005), Israeli archaeologist
Keren Peles (born 1979), Israeli singer-songwriter and pianist
Eliezer Shlomo Schick (1940–2015), Hasidic rabbi

See also
Saham al-Jawlan, village in the Hauran with a short-lived Jewish settlement (1895–96), some of whose colonists, evicted by Ottoman authorities, became the founders of Yavne'el

References

Bibliography

External links
Nefesh B'Nefesh Community Guide for Yavnael, Israel
Official website of Breslov community in yavne'el
Survey of Western Palestine, Map 6: IAA, Wikimedia commons

Breslov Hasidism
Jewish villages in the Ottoman Empire
Local councils in Northern District (Israel)
Populated places established in 1901
1901 establishments in the Ottoman Empire